A Party in Hell is a 1957 Iranian film directed by Samuel Khachikian and Mushegh Sarvarian. It was entered into the 8th Berlin International Film Festival.

Cast
 Reza Arham Sadr as Ahmad
 Ebrahim Bagheri
 Mehdi Reisfirooz
 Rufia
 Ezzatollah Vosoogh as Haji Jabbar
 Ali Zandi

References

External links

1957 films
1950s Persian-language films
Iranian black-and-white films
Films directed by Samuel Khachikian
Films directed by Mushegh Sarvarian